Amélie Carette (1839–1926) born Amélia Bouvet was a French memoir writer and courtier.

She is the daughter of colonel Pierre-Auguste Bouvet  (1809-1864) and the grandchild of rear admiral Pierre François Étienne Bouvet de Maisonneuve.
In 1866, she married the rich politician Jean Pierre Henri Carette (1822–1883).

She was the reader (lectrice) to Empress Eugénie of France 1864–1866, and filled the vacant position of Louise Poitelon du Tarde as lady-in-waiting (Dame du Palais) in 1866–1870. In contrast to what was normally the case, she was housed in the Tuileries Palace rather than having her own residence and merely visiting the court during work hours. She was well-liked by the Empress, who often chose her to accompany her on incognito trips around Paris. She was described as bearing a remarkable likeness to the Empress.

She is known in history as the author of her memoirs, which described life at the French Imperial court of Napoleon III.

References

External links
 Carette, Madame:  Recollections of the court of the Tuileries (1890)
 Carette, Madame: My mistress, the Empress Eugénie; or, Court life at the Tuileries

1839 births
1926 deaths
French ladies-in-waiting
People of the Second French Empire
19th-century French memoirists
French women memoirists